Amherst Regional High School (ARHS) is a secondary school in Amherst, Massachusetts, United States, for students in grades 9–12. It is part of the Amherst-Pelham Regional School District, which comprises the towns of Amherst, Pelham, Leverett, and Shutesbury, Massachusetts. Its official colors are maroon and white. ARHS's current principal, beginning in the 2020-21 academic year, is Talib Sadiq.

Academics 

Amherst Regional High School ran on a trimester system until switching to a semester system in 2016. The students used to take five courses per trimester: normally, three to four were academics, and one to two were electives.  Most academic classes ran for two trimesters.  They ran either straight through or were broken up by the winter trimester.  The exception to this was some social studies and English courses that were a trimester each and some music and AP courses that ran for all three trimesters. Under the current semester system, student take seven classes per semester with a rotating drop schedule. Some classes run for one semester and some for the full academic year. Due to the COVID-19 pandemic the students now have a   Semester and quarter-based  4-block schedule, with each class being 80 minutes. 

Most students take five academic subjects (four for students not taking a world language) worth 4 credits each, or the equivalent, each year.  The equivalent of a four-credit subject may be two separate classes within the same department. Only credits earned during grades 9-12 count toward graduation.  Most full-year courses in grades 9-12 earn 4 credits and most one semester courses earn 2 credits.  To graduate, each student must earn a total of 88 credits in grades 9-12, including the following:

 English: 16 credits (including at least one semester-long literature course in both 11th and 12th grade)
 Social Studies: 12 credits (4 of which must meet the U.S. History requirement)
 Mathematics: 8 credits
 Science: 8 credits in laboratory courses
 Physical Education—Adventure Challenge: 2 credits (taken in 10th grade)
 Health Education: 2 credits (taken in 9th grade)

ARHS has 11 departments and programs in total that all offer a variety of classes for students:

 Art
 English
 English Language Education
 Mathematics
 Performing Arts
 Health, Family, and Physical Education
 Science
 Social Studies
 Special Education
 Business, Technology, and Computer Science Education
 World Languages (Chinese, French, Latin, and Spanish)

Extracurricular and non-academic activities

Sports 
The school's sports teams are known as the Hurricanes. The nickname first appears in the Goldbug yearbook of 1942, in the Sports/Baseball section, "Hurricanes humble Hopkins". The nickname is likely in recognition of the 1938 New England Hurricane. "History of the Class", Goldbug 1939, is entitled "The Epic Of A Hurricane"; it begins "We are a hurricane."

The boys' cross-country team has been listed in the top 100 high school teams in America, and has won many Western Massachusetts championships, most recently in 2018. In 2001 they won the State Championship.

ARHS is one of many high schools in Massachusetts with a nationally ranked Ultimate program. The program hosts the annual Amherst Invitational Ultimate Tournament which pits 30 high school teams from across the country in the oldest and one of the largest high school tournaments in the USA.

The 1992–1993 girls' basketball team inspired the book In These Girls, Hope is a Muscle by Madeleine Blais.

The Football team won the 1999 Massachusetts High School Super Bowl by defeating Southbridge, 27–7. It was the first Super Bowl win for Amherst in 25 years.

The boys' soccer team won the first Western Massachusetts Division I Championship in school history in 2012. That team reached the 2012 State Finals, losing to Needham 1-0. The boys' soccer team won the program's second championship in 2014 after beating West Springfield 1-0. The program won its third title in 5 years in 2016.

Amherst High Athletics came to national attention in the fall of 2016, when the entire volleyball team, with the exception of one player, decided to kneel during the playing of the National Anthem at an away game against rival Minnechaug on Oct. 7, 2016.  The sole player who chose to stand was profiled by ESPN.

State championships 

 Girls' Cross-Country: Seven since 1990
 Boys' Cross-Country: 2001
 Girls' Basketball: 1993
 Boys' Basketball: 2003
 Baseball: 2010
 Boys' Indoor Track: 2014, 2015

Survival living 
ARHS is one of the few schools in the nation to offer a Wilderness Survival program. The class meets after school from January through June, and covers subjects such as orienteering, wilderness first aid, emergency shelters, wild edibles, and emergency fire-building.

Performing arts 
ARHS has a program in music, dance, and theater for beginners and experienced students. ARHS has a history of performing controversial yet inciting works such as The Vagina Monologues and Spring Awakening. 
    
List of Music Ensembles
 Symphonic Orchestra (audition based upper-level orchestra; often plays the music for the graduation ceremony) 
 Philharmonia (freshmen orchestra/open to all string players)
 Chorale (audition based upper-level SATB choir)
 Hurricane Singers (audition based upper-level treble choir)
 Concert Choir (non-audition choir, open to anyone interested in singing)
 Jazz Band (audition based upper-level band)
 Wind Ensemble (audition based upper-level band of woodwinds and percussion)
 Symphony Band (freshmen band/open to all brass, woodwind, and percussion players)

Notable alumni 
 Annie Baker (class of '99), Pulitzer Prize winning playwright 
 Madeleine George, award winning playwright and young-adult author
 Thomas Bezucha (class of '82), film director and writer of Big Eden and The Family Stone
 David F M Brown (class of '81), President, Massachusetts General Hospital; Trustees Endowed Professor, Harvard Medical School
 John Henry, former MLB player (Washington Senators, Boston Braves)
 Michael Hixon (class of '13), American diver 
 James Ihedigbo (class of '02), Philanthropist and retired NFL safety who played 2007-2016 for the New York Jets, New England Patriots, Baltimore Ravens (including 2012 Super Bowl), Detroit Lions, and Buffalo Bills
 Amory Lovins, sustainability guru and CEO of the Rocky Mountain Institute
 Eric Mabius (class of '89), actor known for his roles as Daniel Meade on Ugly Betty and as Tim Haspel on The L Word
 Michael E. Mann (class of ‘88), climatologist and geophysicist and current director of the Earth System Science Center at Pennsylvania State University
 Makaya McCraven (class of '02), jazz drummer and bandleader
 Julie McNiven (class of '98), actress
 Ellen Moran (class of '84), Chief of Staff to the U.S. Secretary of Commerce
 Ebon Moss-Bachrach (class of '95), actor
 J Mascis (class of '84), of Dinosaur Jr. and other bands
 Perry Moss (basketball) (class of '76), played two seasons in the NBA
 Benjamin Nugent (class of '95), writer
 Gil Penchina (class of '87), CEO of Wikia
 Robbie Russell, (class of '97), played soccer for the MLS teams Real Salt Lake and D.C. United
 Deb Talan (class of '86), an American singer-songwriter for the folk-pop duo The Weepies.
 Kaleil Isaza Tuzman and Tom Herman (both class of '89), founders of govWorks and stars of the documentary film Startup.com
 Jamila Wideman (class of '93), former WNBA player
 David Romer (class of '76), Herman Royer Professor of Political Economy at the University of California, Berkeley.
 Christopher O. Ward (class of '72), Executive Director of PANYNJ, NYC Commissioner of Department of Environmental Protection
 Kevin Ziomek (class of '10), professional baseball player in Detroit Tigers minor league

References 

Public high schools in Massachusetts
Schools in Hampshire County, Massachusetts
Buildings and structures in Amherst, Massachusetts
1956 establishments in Massachusetts